Set, The Set, SET or SETS may refer to:

Science, technology, and mathematics

Mathematics
Set (mathematics), a collection of elements
Category of sets, the category whose objects and morphisms are sets and total functions, respectively

Electronics and computing
Set (abstract data type), a data type in computer science that is a collection of unique values
 Set (C++), a set implementation in the C++ Standard Library
 Set (command), a command for setting values of environment variables in Unix and Microsoft operating-systems
 Secure Electronic Transaction, a standard protocol for securing credit card transactions over insecure networks
 Single-electron transistor, a device to amplify currents in nanoelectronics
 Single-ended triode, a type of electronic amplifier
 Set!, a programming syntax in the scheme programming language

Biology and psychology
 Set (psychology), a set of expectations which shapes perception or thought
Set or sett, a badger's den
Set, a small tuber or bulb used instead of seed, especially:
Potato set
Onion set
 SET (gene), gene for a human protein involved in apoptosis, transcription and nucleosome assembly
 Single Embryo Transfer, used in in vitro fertilization

Physics and chemistry
 A chemical change in an adhesive from unbonded to bonded 
 Set, to make/become solid; see Solidification
 Stress–energy tensor, a physical quantity in the theory of fields
 Single electron transfer

Other uses in science and technology
 Saw set, the process of setting the teeth of a saw so each tooth protrudes to the side of the blade
 Scalar expectancy theory, a model of the processes that govern behavior controlled by time
 Science, Engineering & Technology, e.g. The Science, Engineering & Technology Student of the Year Awards
 Setting (typesetting), the act of typesetting a publication for print or display
 Simulated Emergency Test, an amateur radio training exercise
 Software Engineer in Test, a Quality Assurance job title in some software companies
 Strategic Energy Technologies Plan of the European Union
 Suzuki SET, Suzuki Exhaust Tuning of motorcycles

Arts and entertainment

Dance
Set, the basic square formation in square dancing
Set, the basic longwise, square or triangular formation in Scottish Country dancing
Set, the basic formation of more than one couple in Scottish, English and Irish Céilidh

Film, television and theatre
Set (film and TV scenery)
Theatrical scenery
Set construction, construction of scenery for theatrical, movie, television production, and video game production
The Set (film), a 1970 Australian movie
The Set (TV series), an Australian music television show
 Sanlih Entertainment Television, a television channel in Taiwan
 Sony Entertainment Television, a Hindi-language television channel

Music
DJ set or DJ mix, a musical performance by a DJ
Set theory (music), dealing with concepts for categorizing musical objects and describing their relationships
Set (music), a collection of discrete entities, for example pitch sets, duration sets, and timbre sets
Set (Thompson Twins album)
Set (Alex Chilton album)
Set list, a list of songs to be played during musical performances

Other arts
Set (video game), a group of items that adds specific bonuses

Businesses and organizations
 Societatea Pentru Exploatări Tehnice, a Romanian aeronautics company of the 1920s to 1940s
 South Eastern Trains, former train operator England
 Stock Exchange of Thailand, the national stock exchange of Thailand
 SET Index, an index for the Stock Exchange of Thailand
 Study of Exceptional Talent, a program for gifted students
 Sydney Electric Train Society, an electric train preservation society in Sydney, Australia

Religion 
Set (deity) or Seth, an ancient Egyptian deity
Set or Seth, a Biblical character, a son of Adam and Eve

Sport and games
Set (darts), a sequence of games
Set (card game)
Set (cards), two or more cards of the same rank
Set (dominoes), the first play in dominoes
Set, a signal used in American football
The set, a pitching position in baseball
Set, a unit of play in tennis
Set, a team's second contact with the ball in volleyball
Set, a group of repetitions in weight training
Three of a kind (poker), a type of poker hand

Other uses
Set and setting, coined by Timothy Leary to describe the mindset and location of hallucinogenic experiences
Seṭ and aniṭ roots, in Sanskrit grammar
Set (river), a river in northeastern Spain
Selective Employment Tax, a tax in the United Kingdom from 1966 to 1973
Senate Electoral Tribunal, decides election protests for the Senate of the Philippines
A set, set meal, set menu, or table d'hôte: a meal offered at a fixed price
Set, slang term for a subgroup within a gang

See also

Reset (disambiguation)
Digital set (disambiguation)
Seti (disambiguation)
Sett (disambiguation)
Sette (disambiguation)
Setting (disambiguation)
Setup (disambiguation)